Hana Hegerová released six studio albums, including one double set — Šansony s Hanou Hegerovou (1966), Recital (1971), Recital 2 (1973), Lásko prokletá (1977), Potměšilý host (1987) and Mlýnské kolo v srdci mém (2010). Each of them on Supraphon, with exception of her second album issued by Panton.

At the occasion of her 80th birthday anniversary, Hana Hegerová was awarded by the International Federation of the Phonographic Industry for the Czech Republic (ČNS IFPI) with the Diamond award for the total sale of her albums reaching 1,580,000 units.

Albums

Studio albums

Notes
A  Mlýnské kolo v srdci mém (among others, featuring also her cover version of "The Windmills of Your Mind") was classified as the 3rd best-selling album of the year in 2010 in the Czech Republic, following albums Banditi di Praga by Kabát, and Bílé Vánoce by Lucie Bílá. The set was nominated for the Album of the Year at the Anděl Awards 2010, while Hegerová herself was nominated in the Best Female Singer category.

Compilations

Notes
B  "Všechno nejlepší" compilation won "Deska roku" award as the Best-selling Album of a Female Singer in 2006, for the initial sale of 27,984 copies. As of March 2007, the total number reached 33,500 units. (The additional nominated albums featured Měls mě vůbec rád by Ewa Farna and Boomerang by Lucie Vondráčková.)

Live albums

Export albums

Box sets

Soundtracks

Extended plays

Singles

Airplay singles

Videos

Video albums

Notes
C  The DVD release of Koncert was nominated for "Deska roku" as the Best-selling DVD/VHS of 2006. However, it lost in favor Bouře Live by Daniel Landa (with 9,301 sold copies). The third nominee was Lucie Vondráčková for Kliperang.

See also
Strážce plamene v obrazech ("Kdo by se díval nazpátek")

References

General

Specific

External links 

 Hana Hegerová discography (Fansite)
 
 Hana Hegerová discography on CDmusic.cz
 Hana Hegerová discography on Discogs
 Hana Hegerová discography at EuroPopMusic

Pop music discographies